Arabika Massif (Arabika) is a glacially eroded karst outcropping of the Gagra Range, Abkhazia in the West Caucasus, by the city of Gagra.

Geology 
The 13-km-long massif is composed of Lower Cretaceous and Upper Jurassic limestones that dip continuously southwest to the Black Sea and plunge below the modern sea level. The area is densely wooded, with large areas of both coniferous forest and mixed woodland.

The Arabika contains a number of remarkable caves, gorges, wells, and precipices, including the Veryovkina Cave and Voronya Cave, the world's deepest caves. Alexander Kruber was the first to explore some of these features in 1909.

According to Rebecca Felix, the Arabica's "towering heights of limestone suggest the possibility of amazingly deep caves, boring the length of the massif and into the earth below its base".

Notes

References 

Mountain ranges of the Caucasus
Mountain ranges of Abkhazia